Samuel Vogel (July 28, 1902 – February 1971) was an American boxer who competed in the 1920 Summer Olympics. In 1920, he was eliminated in the quarterfinals of the bantamweight class after losing to Henri Hébrants.

References

External links
 Sammy Vogel Bio, Stats, and Results | Olympics at Sports-Reference.com | Wayback machine

1902 births
1971 deaths
Bantamweight boxers
Olympic boxers of the United States
Boxers at the 1920 Summer Olympics
Place of birth missing
Place of death missing
American male boxers